WMGN (98.1 MHz) is a commercial FM radio station in Madison, Wisconsin, known as "Magic 98."  It is owned by Mid-West Family Broadcasting and broadcasts an adult contemporary radio format. Notable programming includes a "Five at Five" feature on weekday evenings with five songs in the same theme, and the syndicated call-in and request show Delilah. Weekend programming includes "Saturday at the 70s", "Sunday At The 80s", and the "Magic Sunday Morning" program.

WMGN has an effective radiated power (ERP) of 36,000 watts.  The transmitter is off County Highway MM, near U.S. Route 14 in Fitchburg.  The studios and offices are on Rayovac Drive in Madison.

WMGN is one of the few AC stations in the U.S. that does not switch to all-Christmas music for part of November and most of December. Instead, the all-holiday music format in Madison can be heard on iHeartMedia’s 92.1 WXXM and on Audacy’s 105.1 WMHX.  WMGN does switch to all-Christmas music a few days before December 25th, calling it "The 98 Hours of Christmas," tying in its dial position.

History
The original call sign was WISC-FM. It was mostly simulcast with sister station WISC 1480 AM (now WLMV). WISC-AM-FM were owned by Radio Wisconsin, Inc., with offices in the Commercial State Bank Building. WISC-FM was the second commercial FM station in Madison, going on the air a year after 101.5 WIBA-FM.

WISC-AM-FM slightly changed their call letters to WISM-AM-FM in 1959.  They were network affiliates of the Mutual Broadcasting System.  By the late 1960s, WISM-FM had a separate easy listening format, that was largely automated.

By the 1980s, the easy listening format was attracting mostly older listeners.  To gain a younger audience, WISM-FM flipped to soft rock as "Movin' Easy 98 FM."  On December 1, 1983, the station changed its call letters to WMGN with the moniker "Magic 98."  The format switched to soft adult contemporary music.  Over time, the tempo picked up and WMGN became a Mainstream AC station.

References

External links
WMGN official website

MGN
Mainstream adult contemporary radio stations in the United States